The rufous-brown solitaire (Cichlopsis leucogenys) is a species of bird in the thrush family Turdidae. It is found in Brazil, Colombia, Ecuador, Guyana, Peru, Suriname, and Venezuela. Its natural habitats are subtropical or tropical moist lowland forest and subtropical or tropical moist montane forest.

References

rufous-brown solitaire
Birds of the Colombian Andes
Birds of the Ecuadorian Andes
Birds of the Peruvian Andes
Birds of the Guianas
Birds of the Atlantic Forest
rufous-brown solitaire
Taxonomy articles created by Polbot